Geoffrey David Claud Tudor (29 December 1923 – 2 October 2018) was a British middle-distance runner.

Career
Born in 1923 he was the son of Claud Tudor. Geoffrey competed in the 1948 Summer Olympics in the men's 3000 metres steeplechase event. Tudor later taught English and Mathematics at Abingdon School from 1948-49  before moving to Devon to teach at the University College of the South West of England. He died in October 2018 at the age of 94 in Bradiford, Devon.

References

1923 births
2018 deaths
Athletes (track and field) at the 1948 Summer Olympics
British male steeplechase runners
Olympic athletes of Great Britain
Staff of Abingdon School
Academics of the University of Exeter
British people in colonial India